William Mims (January 15, 1927 – April 9, 1991) was an American actor. He appeared in numerous films such as The Day Mars Invaded Earth, The Ballad of Cable Hogue, and Hot Rods to Hell. He also appeared in classic television series such as Hogan's Heroes, The Beverly Hillbillies, Petticoat Junction, Bonanza, Custer, Wagon Train, Lancer, Perry Mason, Alfred Hitchcock Presents, Thriller, The Twilight Zone, The Fugitive, The Wild Wild West, Airwolf, Adam-12, Ironside, Night Gallery, Kolchak: The Night Stalker, Kung Fu, Columbo and Fantasy Island .

In 1962 Mims appeared as Frank Farnum on the TV western Lawman in the episode titled "The Bride." 

Mims was born in Carthage, Missouri, in 1927 and moved to Los Angeles when still a teenager. He graduated from Manual Arts High School and Los Angeles City College. In addition to his film and TV roles, he acted on the Los Angeles stage in Inherit the Wind and Cat on a Hot Tin Roof. He was also the founder and president of The Hollywood Hackers Celebrity Golf Club. He died of cardiac arrest on April 9, 1991, in Studio City, Los Angeles, California at age 64. He was survived by his wife of 36 years, Nancy.

Filmography

References

External links
 
 

1927 births
1991 deaths
20th-century American male actors
American male film actors